Alter Ego is an adventure game developed by the Czech company Future Games in 2010. The game uses the AGDS Engine. It was the last game by Future Games.

Story 
The story takes place in Plymouth of 19th century. Sir William, who is a suspected serial killer, dies. His body disappears and people in town start to disappear. The story revolves around police investigator Briscol and thief Timothy Moor who is involved in the case against his will.

Reception 
The game's reception has been average. The game was praised for its graphics and atmosphere but was criticized for its difficulty, story and ending.

References 

2010 video games
Adventure games
Point-and-click adventure games
Single-player video games
Video games about police officers
Video games developed in the Czech Republic
Video games set in England
Video games set in Plymouth
Video games set in the 19th century
Viva Media games
Windows games
Windows-only games